Hyalodia is a monotypic butterfly genus of the subfamily Satyrinae in the family Nymphalidae. Its one species is Hyalodia tenuisquamosa.

References

Satyrini
Monotypic butterfly genera